María Josefa Gabriela Cariño de Silang (March 19, 1731 – September 20, 1763) was a Filipino military leader best known for her role as the female leader of the Ilocano independence movement from Spain. She took over from her second husband Diego Silang after his assassination in 1763, leading her people for four months before she was captured and executed by the colonial government of the Captaincy General of the Philippines.

Early life
Gabriela Silang was born in Barangay Caniogan, Santa, Ilocos Sur to a Spanish Ilocano father named Anselmo Cariño, a trader who ferried his wares from Vigan to Abra along the Abra River and a descendant of Ignacio Cariño, the first Galician from Spain to arrive in Candon, Ilocos Sur in the late 17th century. Her mother was a Tinguian who was from a Tinguian barrio in San Quintin, Abra (now Pidigan). 

She received a Catholic upbringing from the town's parish priest, and attained elementary level education at the town's convent school. After being separated from her parents early in her childhood, she was raised by a priest, who eventually arranged a marriage between her and the wealthy businessman. They married in 1751, and he died three years later.

Revolutionary involvement

Relationship with her spouse, Diego Silang
After being widowed by her first husband, Gabriela met future insurgent leader Diego Silang and married him in 1757.

In 1762, as part of what would later be known as the Seven Years' War, the Kingdom of Great Britain declared war on Spain, and captured Manila, resulting in the British occupying the city and nearby Cavite. After the capture of Manila, an emboldened Diego sought to initiate an armed struggle to overthrow Spanish functionaries in Ilocos and replace them with native-born officials. He joined forces with the British, who appointed him governor of Ilocos on their behalf. During this revolt, Gabriela became one of Diego's closest advisors and his unofficial aide-de-camp during skirmishes with Spanish troops. She was also a major figure in her husband's co-operation with the British.

Spanish authorities retaliated by offering a reward for Diego’s assassination. Consequently, his two former allies, Miguel Vicos and Pedro Becbec, killed him in Vigan on May 28, 1763.

Revolutionary leadership in Abra
After Diego's assassination, Gabriela fled to Tayum, Abra to seek refuge in the house of her paternal uncle, Nicolás Cariño. There, she appointed her first two generals, Miguel Flores and Tagabuen Infiel. She later assumed her husband's role as commander of the rebel troops and achieved a "priestess" status amongst her community and followers. Her popular image as the bolo-wielding La Generala on horseback stems from this period.

Assault on Vigan and execution
On September 10, 1763, Silang attempted to besiege Vigan but the Spanish retaliated, forcing her into hiding. She retreated once more to Abra, where the Spanish later captured her. On September 20, 1763, Silang and her troops were executed by hanging in Vigan's central plaza.

Legacy

She is remembered as the “Joan of Arc of Ilocandia” The Order of Gabriela Silang is the sole third class national decoration awarded by the Philippines whose membership is restricted to women. The organisation and party list Gabriela Women's Party ("General Assembly Binding Women for Reforms, Integrity, Equality, Leadership, and Action"), which advocates for women's rights and issues, was founded in April 1984 in her honour. The BRP Gabriela Silang (OPV-8301) is named after her. Asteroid 7026 Gabrielasilang, discovered by Eleanor Helin at Palomar in 1993, is named in her honor. The official  was published by the Minor Planet Center on November 8, 2019.

Descendants
A list of the closest-living relatives of Gabriela Cariño Silang through her paternal uncle, Nicolas Cariño:

 Ambassador José Maria Ancheta Cariño
 Dion Cariño
 Rosarito A. Cariño
 Nehemiah Cariño
 Jan Philippe Cariño
 Felipe Cariño
 Sergio Cariño
 John Leonard Cariño
 Jose Angelo Cariño
 Therese M. Cariño
 Christine M. Cariño
 Gloman Merritt
 Glozy Merritt
 Princess Mynn Hosea Merritt
 Materno Marcos ma. Guzman Carino
 Carlo Antonio Cariño Diy
 Rolando A. Cariño
 Donya Soccoro Cariño De Leon
 Elizabeth Cariño De Leon
 Hermoso Cariño De Leon Jr.
 Dr. Noel Cariño De Leon
 Jocelyn Cariño De Leon
 Jasper De Leon De Jesus
 Jizyt De Leon De Jesus
 Jinkyl De Leon De Jesus
 Jixtryl De Leon De Jesus
 Eva Cariño
 Pheobe Gazmen-Cariño
 Adelaida Cariño
 Candonino Gazmen-Cariño
 Nestor Gazmen-Cariño
 Abraham Cariño-Gazmen
 Seny Fe Cariño-Gazmen Mangay-ayam
 Jessie Carino-Gazmen Cruz
 Agnes-Jocelyn Cariño-Arcelona Stupp
 Emmanuel Cariño-Arcelona
 Melvin Cariño-Arcelona
 Ann-Loretta Cariño-Arcelona Maxey
 Belen-Eloisa Cariño-Arcelona Stewart
 Dr. Milenda Palafox Cariño-Arcelona

Some of Silang's living relations still reside in the ancestral house at the Cariño family seat of Tayum. The house, now a museum and art gallery called the Casa Museo Cariño, is maintained by Rosarito A. Cariño. Among the rooms on display is the bedroom of Gabriela Cariño Silang while she used the house of her uncle, Nicolas Cariño, as her headquarters when she fled after Diego's murder in 1763.

In popular culture
 Silang was portrayed by Tanya Gomez in the 1996 TV Series Bayani of ABS-CBN in the two-episode "Gabriela Silang: Ang Alap" and "Diego Silang: Ang Sulat."
 Silang was portrayed by Kris Bernal in the 2013 GMA Network historical drama series Indio and by Glaiza de Castro in the GMA News TV television romance anthology Wagas.

References

External links
 
 Birthplace of Gabriela Silang – Municipality of Santa, Ilocos Sur
 Pictures of The Ancestral House of Gabriela Silang
 

1731 births
1763 deaths
18th-century executions by Spain
British invasion of Manila
Executed Filipino women
People of Galician descent
Filipino people of Spanish descent
Filipino Roman Catholics
Ilocano people
Paramilitary Filipinos
People executed by Spain by hanging
People from Ilocos Sur
People of Spanish colonial Philippines
Filipino rebels
Women in 18th-century warfare
Women in war in the Philippines
Female revolutionaries
Separatism in the Philippines